Kartavya may refer to:

Kartavya (organization), a national non-governmental organization in India
Kartavya (1979 film)
Kartavya (1985 film)
Kartavya (1995 film)